Keeping Tradition is a studio album by American jazz singer Dee Dee Bridgewater. The album was recorded in Paris and released in 1993 via Verve Records label. The album was nominated for Best Jazz Vocal Performance in the 37th Annual Grammy Awards. Keeping Tradition opens a series of her critically acclaimed titles, of which all but one, including her wildly successful double Grammy Award-winning tribute to Ella Fitzgerald, Dear Ella, have received Grammy nominations.

Reception
Scott Yanow of AllMusic wrote: "After performing a wide variety of music (much of it commercial) for 15 years, in the mid-'80s Dee Dee Bridgewater returned to jazz... This set with her regular French quartet has Bridgewater exploring and swinging some of her favorite standards... This CD is highly recommended, as are all of Dee Dee Bridgewater's Verve recordings."

Track listing

Personnel
Dee Dee Bridgewater – vocals
Thierry Eliez – piano
Hein van de Geyn – bass, arrangements
André Ceccarelli – drums

References

External links 

Dee Dee Bridgewater albums
1993 albums
Verve Records albums